Under the Sun of Satan is Georges Bernanos's first published novel, appearing in 1926 in Paris. 

According to Michel Estève, the novel draws on three primary inspirations: the life of the curate Jean-Marie Vianney, which informs the character Donissan; the writers Léon Bloy and Jules Barbey d'Aurevilly, from whom Bernanos takes the idea of a world deprived of God and the idea of a union of reality and the supernatural, respectively; and the social climate of France after World War I, which Bernanos vocally decried.

It is listed #45 on Le Monde's 100 Books of the Century.

Adaptations

Television
 Sous le soleil de Satan, téléfilm by Pierre Cardinal (1971) with Maurice Garrel and Catherine Salviat

Cinema
 Sous le soleil de Satan, film de Maurice Pialat (1987) with Gérard Depardieu and Sandrine Bonnaire. The film won the  Palme d'or at the Festival de Cannes 1987.

References

External links 
Under the Sun of Satan on Goodreads 

1926 French novels
French-language novels
French novels adapted into films
Novels by Georges Bernanos
1926 debut novels